Perfection and Failure is the debut full-length studio album by the Italian melodic death metal band Neptune, released by the band's own label Neptunedeath Productions and distributed by Benzoworld.

Track listing 
 "Introducing Apocalypse"
 "Scratched Avantgarde Dream"
 "Animal Trial Experiments"
 "Breathing New Element"
 "Unproject Holocaust"
 "Angel Factory Avaria"
 "Perfection and Failure"

Credits

Band members 
 Andrea Mameli − Guitars
 Mattia Nidini − Death Vocals
 Francesco Adami − Bass
 Corrado Zoccatelli − Drums
 Francesco Moro − Guitars
 Alessio De Antoni − Keyboards

Other 
 Graphics layout by Mattia Nidini at www.EastAsiaIndustries.com.

Neptune (Italian band) albums
2004 debut albums